Wood Street station is a station on Pittsburgh Regional Transit's light rail network, located in Pittsburgh, Pennsylvania. It serves the city's Downtown district and is located at the intersection of Wood Street and Liberty Avenue. Passengers embarking at the Wood Street station may travel free to any of the other stations in the Downtown area– First Avenue, Steel Plaza, Gateway, North Shore and Allegheny. Wood Street Galleries, an art gallery, is located directly above the station entrance. The station itself plays no role in fare collection, which is done on board the train.

The stop serves the northern portion of downtown, which features major office buildings such as One PNC Plaza, K&L Gates Center, and EQT Plaza. The Cultural District, which features performance venues such as the Benedum Center, the Byham Theater, and Heinz Hall is located in the blocks just to the north of the station, while the David L. Lawrence Convention Center is within walking distance.

References

External links 

 Wood Street entrance from Google Maps Street View

Port Authority of Allegheny County stations
Railway stations in the United States opened in 1985
Railway stations located underground in Pennsylvania
Blue Line (Pittsburgh)
Red Line (Pittsburgh)
Silver Line (Pittsburgh)